The following list of Carnegie libraries in New Jersey provides information on United States Carnegie libraries in New Jersey, where 36 libraries were built from grants totaling $1,066,553 awarded by the Carnegie Corporation of New York from 1900 to 1917. There are 17 municipal libraries with Carnegie buildings still in operation as public libraries (*). Two have become academic libraries.

Key

Carnegie libraries

History 
A few of the first public libraries created in New Jersey date back to the mid-eighteenth century, more than twenty of which were established and operational by 1800. When the New Jersey Library Association (NJLA) was founded in 1890, upwards of fifty-seven public libraries were established and operating statewide. In 1900, New Jersey state legislature created the Public Library Commission (PLC) as a method to provide support for public libraries. Around this same time, Andrew Carnegie was in the process of assisting communities all across the United States in building, staffing, and providing support for public libraries. During his mission, Andrew Carnegie donated millions of dollars to the construction and operation of thousands of libraries for "the improvement of mankind."

Due in part to his contributions, New Jersey acquired two hundred and three new libraries in those twenty years, bringing the total number of operational public libraries in New Jersey from one hundred and two in 1901 to three hundred and twenty-five in 1920. The state of New Jersey was allocated $1,066,935 across twenty nine communities, which ranked New Jersey as the number eleven state in terms of the number of communities assisted by Andrew Carnegie's donations. The communities that were assisted ranged from large cities to small towns and contained a diverse selection on economic backgrounds. In these twenty-nine communities, there were twenty-nine main libraries built as well as an additional six branch libraries. At this time, New Jersey as was the sixteenth most populated state and only received fourteen percent of the total granted donated by Andrew Carnegie.

Notes

References

Note: The above references, while all authoritative, are not entirely mutually consistent. Some details of this list may have been drawn from one of the references without support from the others.  Reader discretion is advised.

External links
NJ libraries in early postcards

New Jersey
Libraries

Libraries